Jorge Luis Clavelo Tejeda (born 8 August 1982) is a Cuban footballer who plays as a defender for Bauger FC in the Liga Dominicana de Fútbol.

Club career
After spending the majority of his career at hometown club Villa Clara, he made his debut for Dominican Republic side Bauger on 9 April 2016 after solving his immigration situation.

International career
He made his international debut for Cuba in a September 2006 CONCACAF Gold Cup qualification match against Turks & Caicos and has earned a total of 56 caps, scoring 2 goals. He also captained the team and represented his country in 12 FIFA World Cup qualifying matches. He played at 4 CONCACAF Gold Cup final tournaments.

His final international was a January 2016 friendly match against Panama.

International goals
Scores and results list Cuba's goal tally first.

Achievements
Cuba
Caribbean Cup winner: 2012

FC Villa Clara
Cuban League (5): 2002–03, 2004–05, 2010–11, 2011–12 and 2013.

References

External links

1982 births
Living people
Association football central defenders
Cuban footballers
Cuba international footballers
2011 CONCACAF Gold Cup players
2013 CONCACAF Gold Cup players
2015 CONCACAF Gold Cup players
FC Villa Clara players
Liga Dominicana de Fútbol players
Bauger FC players
Don Bosco Jarabacoa FC players
Cuban expatriate footballers
Cuban expatriate sportspeople in the Dominican Republic
Expatriate footballers in the Dominican Republic
People from Santa Clara, Cuba